Second-order may refer to:

Mathematics
 Second order approximation, an approximation that includes quadratic terms
 Second-order arithmetic, an axiomatization allowing quantification of sets of numbers
 Second-order differential equation, a differential equation in which the highest derivative is the second
 Second-order logic, an extension of predicate logic
 Second-order perturbation, in perturbation theory

Science and technology
 Second-order cybernetics, the recursive application of cybernetics to itself and the reflexive practice of cybernetics according to this critique.
 Second-order fluid, an extension of fluid dynamics
 Second order Fresnel lens, a size of lighthouse lens
 Second-order reaction, a reaction in which the rate is proportional to the square of a reactant's concentration

Psychology and philosophy
 Second-order conditioning, a form of learning from previous learning
 Second-order desire, the desire to have a desire for something
 Second-order stimulus, a visual stimulus distinguished by an aspect other than luminance

Other uses
 Second Order (religious), the cloistered nuns who are affiliated with mendicant orders of friars